2009–10 Moldovan National Division season is the 16th Moldovan National Division season in the history of FC Nistru.

Current squad 
Squad given according to the official website as of June 6, 2010

National Division results

References 

Moldovan football clubs 2009–10 season
FC Nistru Otaci